George Murray is an American bass guitarist best known for his work with David Bowie  on a number of Bowie's albums released in the 1970s. Murray was part of Bowie's rhythm section, the D.A.M. Trio, for much of the decade, alongside drummer Dennis Davis and guitarist Carlos Alomar.

He studied at Bronx Community College and had toured Europe, South America and Canada with George McCrae as well as touring and performing with the Broadway plays Don't Bother Me, I Can't Cope and Your Arms Too Short to Box with God, prior to his work with Bowie.

As of 2017 Murray works at a school district in California where he lives with his wife, Teresa Woo-Murray, and son, Marcus.

Selective discography
Weldon Irvine
Cosmic Vortex (Justice Divine) (1974)
In Harmony (1974)

David Bowie
Station to Station (1976)
Live Nassau Coliseum '76 (released 2010)
Low (1977)
"Heroes" (1977)
Stage (1978)
Welcome to the Blackout (Live London '78) (released 2018)
Lodger (1979)
Scary Monsters (And Super Creeps) (1980)

Iggy Pop
The Idiot (1977)

Jerry Harrison
The Red and the Black (1981)

Links 
2017 video interview with George Murray

References

External links

Living people
Year of birth missing (living people)
Musicians from Queens, New York
American session musicians
Bronx Community College alumni